John J. Keane was an Irish politician. He was elected to Dáil Éireann as a Fianna Fáil Teachta Dála (TD) for the Galway West constituency at the Galway West by-election held on 30 May 1940. The by-election was caused by the death of the Fianna Fáil TD Seán Tubridy. Keane lost his seat at the 1943 general election. He stood unsuccessfully at several subsequent general elections but was not re-elected to the Dáil again.

References

Year of birth missing
Year of death missing
Fianna Fáil TDs
Politicians from County Galway
Members of the 10th Dáil